(born 24 January 1965) is a Japanese video game developer working for Square Enix. He has worked there since 1985, and has worked as the lead designer for Final Fantasy IV as well as the director of Live A Live, Parasite Eve and Chrono Trigger.

Career
Tokita joined Square in 1985 as a part-time employee, not becoming full-time until the development of Final Fantasy IV. For the first three Final Fantasy games, he worked on graphic design, testing, and sound effects, respectively, before becoming lead designer of Final Fantasy IV in 1991.

Tokita wanted to make a career as a theater actor, but working on Final Fantasy IV made him decide to become a "great creator" of video games. He was one of only 14 people working on the game. Tokita feels that Final Fantasy IV is the first game in the series to really pick up on drama, and the first Japanese RPG to feature "such deep characters and plot". He also felt that Final Fantasy IV was so good because it was the culmination of the best parts of the first three games.

Following that title, he was also involved in the production of Final Fantasy VII.

Chrono Trigger is a role-playing video game developed and published by Square for the Super Nintendo Entertainment System in 1995. Director credits were attributed to Akihiko Matsui, Yoshinori Kitase and Takashi Tokita. Tetsuya Takahashi had the role of graphic director. Additionally, Takashi Tokita, along with Yoshinori Kitase wrote the various subplots to the game.

He handled the game design for Parasite Eve and wrote the game's story. He considers the later games in the series as having been "handed off" to others.

After the successful remakes of Final Fantasy III and Final Fantasy IV, there was a desire by the team to make a new game in the same style.

He was the lead developer on Final Fantasy IV: The After Years.

His greatest inspiration was Dragon Quest 2, since it emotionally engaged him like no game he had played before.

Between 2003 and 2007, Tokita was the head of Square's Product Development Division 7.

Currently, Tokita is a senior manager and producer in Square Enix's Business Division 8.

Games
 Aliens: Alien 2 (1987) — Graphic design
 Cleopatra no Mahō (1987) — Graphic design
 Nakayama Miho no Tokimeki High School (1987) — Graphic design
 Hanjuku Hero (1988) — Graphic design
 Square's Tom Sawyer (1989) — Graphic design 
 Final Fantasy Legend (1989) — Scenario, Sprite graphics, Character design, Sound effects
 Final Fantasy III (1990) — Sound effects
 Rad Racer II (1990) — Sound effects
 Final Fantasy IV (1991) — Lead game designer, scenario writer
 Final Fantasy V (1992) — Special thanks
 Hanjuku Hero: Aa, Sekaiyo Hanjukunare...! (1992) — Scenario director
 Live A Live (1994) — Director, scenario writer, event designer
 Chrono Trigger (1995) — Director, scenario writer
 DynamiTracer (1996) — Producer
 Final Fantasy VII (1997) — Event planner
 Parasite Eve (1998) — Director, scenario writer
 Parasite Eve II (1999) — Special advisor
 Chocobo Racing (1999) — Director, scenario writer, lyrics
 The Bouncer (2000) — Director, dramatisation, lyrics
 Hanjuku Eiyuu Tai 3D (2003)  Director, producer
 Egg Monster Hero (2004) — Producer
 Hanjuku Eiyuu 4 (2005) — Director, producer
 Final Fantasy I & II: Dawn of Souls (2005) — Game designer, producer
 Final Fantasy IV Advance (2005) — Supervisor
 Musashi: Samurai Legend (2005) — Producer
 Final Fantasy IV DS (2007) — Director, executive producer
 Final Fantasy IV: The After Years (2008) — Producer, scenario writer, game design
 Nanashi no Game (2008) — Executive producer
 Final Fantasy: The 4 Heroes of Light (2009) — Director, scenario writer
 Dissidia 012: Final Fantasy (2011) — Special thanks
 Ikenie no Yoru (2011) — Co-director
 Final Fantasy IV: The Complete Collection (2011) — Supervisor
 Theatrhythm Final Fantasy (2012) — Special thanks
 Final Fantasy Dimensions (2012) — Producer, scenario writer, game design
 Demons' Score (2012) — Producer
 Final Fantasy IV for smartphones (2012) — Supervisor
 Final Fantasy V for smartphones (2013) — Special thanks
 Final Fantasy IV: The After Years 3D remake (2013) — Producer
 Final Fantasy VI for smartphones (2014) — Special thanks
 Theatrhythm Final Fantasy Curtain Call (2014) — Special thanks
Dissidia Final Fantasy (2015) — Special thanks
 Final Fantasy Legends: Toki no Suishō (2015-2017) — General director, scenario & game designer, illustrator, lyrics
 Holy Dungeon (2015) — Writer
 Final Fantasy: Brave Exvius (2015) — Special thanks
 I Am Setsuna (2016) — Special thanks
 Kingsglaive: Final Fantasy XV (2016) — Special thanks
 Itadaki Street: Dragon Quest and Final Fantasy 30th Anniversary (2017) — Final Fantasy character supervisor
 Oninaki (2019) — Creative producer
 Live A Live (Remake) (2022) — Producer, scenario writer
 Theatrhythm Final Bar Line (2023) — Special thanks
 Octopath Traveler II (2023) — Special thanks

References

External links

Takashi Tokita profile, interviews, and photo gallery at the Square Haven People Database

Living people
1965 births
Japanese video game directors
Square Enix people